Oleg Vladimirovich Kryazhev, born October 9, 1970 in Ust-Kamenogorsk, Kazakh SSR, Soviet Union) is a retired Kazakhstani professional ice hockey player, who played for Team Kazakhstan at the 1998 Winter Olympic Games.

Career statistics

Regular season and playoffs

RUS.2 totals do not include stats from the 1994–95 season.

International

External links

1970 births
Living people
Avangard Omsk players
HC Sibir Novosibirsk players
Ice hockey players at the 1998 Winter Olympics
Kazakhstani ice hockey left wingers
Kazzinc-Torpedo players
Olympic ice hockey players of Kazakhstan
Sportspeople from Oskemen
Soviet ice hockey left wingers
Asian Games silver medalists for Kazakhstan
Medalists at the 2003 Asian Winter Games
Asian Games medalists in ice hockey
Ice hockey players at the 2003 Asian Winter Games